The Hugo Black House was a historic house in Ashland, Clay County, Alabama.  The one-and-a-half-story, wood-frame residence was purchased by William LaFayette and Martha Black in 1893.  They were the parents of politician and U.S. Supreme Court jurist Hugo Black, who grew up in the house.  The house was added to the National Register of Historic Places on October 9, 1973.

It has since been destroyed.

Notes

References

National Register of Historic Places in Clay County, Alabama
Houses in Clay County, Alabama
Houses on the National Register of Historic Places in Alabama